Ian McGuckin (born 24 April 1973) is an English former footballer who played in the Football League for Fulham, Hartlepool United and Oxford United.

References

1973 births
Living people
Footballers from Middlesbrough
English footballers
Association football defenders
Hartlepool United F.C. players
Fulham F.C. players
Oxford United F.C. players
Barrow A.F.C. players
English Football League players
Hartlepool United F.C. non-playing staff